Aquatic Toxicology is a monthly peer-reviewed scientific journal that was established in 1981. It covers toxicological research in aquatic environments.

Abstracting and indexing
The journal is abstracted and indexed by BIOSIS, Chemical Abstracts, Current Contents/Agriculture, Biology & Environmental Sciences, EMBASE, BIOBASE, GEOBASE, and Scopus. According to the Journal Citation Reports, the journal has a 2020 impact factor of 4.964.

References

External links
 

Toxicology journals
Elsevier academic journals
Publications established in 1981
English-language journals
Monthly journals